Syaiful Syamsuddin (born 11 June 1993) is an Indonesian professional footballer who plays as a goalkeeper for Liga 1 club Dewa United.

References

External links
 

Living people
1993 births
Indonesian footballers
Sportspeople from South Sulawesi
Liga 1 (Indonesia) players
Association football goalkeepers
Persita Tangerang players
PSM Makassar players
PS Barito Putera players
Dewa United F.C. players